Paul Breitner (born 5 September 1951) is a German former professional footballer who played as a midfielder and left-back. Considered one of the best players of his era, Breitner was named in the FIFA World Cup All-Time Team and in 2004, he was named one of the Top 125 greatest living footballers as part of FIFA's 100th anniversary celebration.

Breitner was capped 48 times for West Germany and was an integral part of the team that won the 1974 FIFA World Cup, scoring in the final. 

He also scored in the final of the 1982 FIFA World Cup, making him one of only five players to have scored in two different World Cup final matches, the others being Pelé, Vavá, Zinedine Zidane and Kylian Mbappé.

He was known for his partnerships with Franz Beckenbauer and Berti Vogts in defence for the national team, and his midfield combination with Karl-Heinz Rummenigge for Bayern Munich.

Breitner has been working as a commentator, pundit and columnist in Germany since retiring and is also an advisor to the Bayern management board.

Playing career
Breitner's football career lasted from 1970 until 1983, mainly playing for Bayern Munich (1970–74 and 1978–83) and Real Madrid (1974–77), with one season playing for Eintracht Braunschweig. His early success was as a free roaming left back, as likely to score from the right midfield as to stop an attacker in his own penalty area. Later in his career he moved to midfield and became one of the top midfielders through the early 1980s.

The early peak of Breitner's long and successful career was at age 21 in 1972 as part of the winning German European Championship team. Two years later he won the 1974 FIFA World Cup. The final was played in Munich against the Netherlands, and Breitner scored the first German goal on a penalty kick. In the final, he, Franz Beckenbauer and Berti Vogts formed a formidable unit at the back, their resolute defense preventing the Dutch from getting many scoring chances. He moved to Real Madrid following the World Cup and withdrew from the West German squad, remaining off the side until enticed to return by Jupp Derwall in 1981. Breitner is one of only four footballers to have achieved the feat of scoring in two different World Cup final matches, sharing that honour with Pelé, Vavá, and Zinedine Zidane. He achieved this in 1974 against the Netherlands and in 1982 against Italy.

During his club career, Breitner won seven National Championships with Bayern Munich (1972, 1973, 1974, 1980, 1981) and Real Madrid (1975, 1976), the Champions' Cup (1974) as well as the German (1971, 1982) and Spanish cups (1975). During his spell with Bayern Munich, Karl-Heinz Rummenigge and he formed such a formidable one-two-punch that they were often called Breitnigge.

Outside the pitch, Breitner self identified as part of the 68ers (the 1968 protest movement in Germany and elsewhere). He was often decried by the more traditional or conservative football fans for his radicalism and "revolutionary" attitude, as well as his tendency for voicing strong opinions on major political and social issues, especially during a time when Germany was still divided by the Berlin Wall. He was seen bringing Mao Zedong's "Little Red Book" to training. However, after 1974, Breitner abruptly brushed aside his leftist leanings. While his Dutch World Cup rival Johan Cruyff had publicly declared to never play for a club associated with "fascist" General Franco, Breitner yearned to play for Real Madrid and signed the transfer documents in 1974. Subsequently, he gained notoriety for spending lavishly on houses and cars, as well as participating in lucrative commercials.

He boycotted the 1978 FIFA World Cup being hosted by the Argentine military, the only player to do so.

Before the 1982 World Cup in Spain he caused a major uproar in Germany when he accepted an offer by Pitralon, a German cosmetics company to pay him the – what many Germans regarded at that time as a "scandalously high" – sum of 150,000 Deutsche Mark if he shaved off his fluffy full beard, used their aftershave and advertised for the company. In the previous years his long hair had been perceived as a show of rebellion. Breitner had previously infuriated many fans with his move to Spanish club giants Real Madrid. He returned to Germany after the successful spell in Madrid and retired as a player in 1983.

Post-retirement
In 1998, Breitner was announced as the new national team manager by DFB president Egidius Braun. However, after some steam from fellow association officials, Braun reconsidered 17 hours later, making Breitner the infamous 17 Stunden Bundestrainer ("the 17-hour coach").

Today, Breitner mainly works as a TV pundit and newspaper columnist. In March 2007, he entered into a contract with Bayern Munich and acts as an advisor on various issues.  He occasionally still plays for the Bayern All-Stars in charity games, captaining the team on several occasions.

Career statistics

Honours
Bayern Munich
 Bundesliga: 1971–72, 1972–73, 1973–74, 1979–80, 1980–81
 DFB-Pokal: 1970–71, 1981–82
 European Cup: 1973–74; runner-up: 1981–82

Real Madrid
 La Liga: 1974–75, 1975–76
 Copa del Rey: 1974–75

West Germany
 FIFA World Cup: 1974; runner-up: 1982
 UEFA European Championship: 1972

Individual
 kicker Bundesliga Team of the Season: 1971–72, 1972–73, 1978–79, 1979–80, 1980–81, 1981–82, 1982–83
UEFA European Championship Team of the Tournament: 1972
 FIFA World Cup All-Star Team: 1974
 Footballer of the Year (Germany): 1981
 Ballon d'Or runner-up: 1981
 IOC European Footballer of the Season 1980–81
 FIFA World Cup All-Time Team
 FIFA 100
 Bayern Munich All-time XI
 Ballon d'Or Dream Team (bronze): 2020

References

External links 

 

1951 births
Association football fullbacks
Association football midfielders
Association football utility players
Living people
People from Kolbermoor
Sportspeople from Upper Bavaria
West German expatriate footballers
German footballers
Germany international footballers
Germany under-21 international footballers
Germany youth international footballers
West German expatriate sportspeople in Spain
FC Bayern Munich footballers
Eintracht Braunschweig players
La Liga players
Real Madrid CF players
FIFA 100
Footballers from Bavaria
FIFA World Cup-winning players
1974 FIFA World Cup players
1982 FIFA World Cup players
UEFA European Championship-winning players
UEFA Euro 1972 players
Bundesliga players
UEFA Champions League winning players
West German footballers